Li Zhongting (born 12 May 1995) is a Chinese footballer currently playing as a midfielder for Heilongjiang Ice City.

Career statistics

Club

Notes

References

1995 births
Living people
Footballers from Shenyang
Footballers from Liaoning
Chinese footballers
Association football midfielders
Campeonato de Portugal (league) players
China League One players
Changchun Yatai F.C. players
G.D. Tourizense players
C.D. Cova da Piedade players
Liaoning Shenyang Urban F.C. players
Chinese expatriate footballers
Chinese expatriate sportspeople in Portugal
Expatriate footballers in Portugal
GS Loures players